Major-General Sir John Malcolm GCB, KLS (2 May 1769 – 30 May 1833) was a Scottish soldier, diplomat, East India Company administrator, statesman, and historian.

Early life
Sir John Malcolm was born in 1769, one of seventeen children of George Malcolm, an impoverished tenant farmer in Eskdale in the Scottish Border country, and his wife Margaret ('Bonnie Peggy'), née Pasley, the sister of Admiral Sir Thomas Pasley. His brothers included Sir James Malcolm, Admiral Sir Pulteney Malcolm and Sir Charles Malcolm. He left school, family and country at the age of thirteen, and achieved distinction in the East India Company, where he was nicknamed 'Boy Malcolm.'

Career
Arriving at Madras in 1783 as an ensign in the East India Company's Madras Army, he served as a regimental soldier for eleven years, before spending a year in Britain to restore his health. He returned to India in 1795 as Military Secretary to General Sir Alured Clarke, participating en route in Clarke's capture of the Cape of Good Hope.
In the Anglo-Mysore wars of 1799 he served with the Hyderabad contingent, and later as joint secretary of the Peace Commission setting up the new government of Mysore. Later that year he was selected by the Governor-General (Lord Mornington, later Marquess Wellesley) to lead a diplomatic mission to Iran. Following his return in 1801 he became Wellesley's private secretary, based in Calcutta (Kolkata).

In the Anglo-Maratha war of 1803–05, he accompanied Sir Arthur Wellesley (later Duke of Wellington) as the Governor-General's representative and diplomatic agent; the two men forming a lifelong friendship. In 1804 he was appointed British Resident at Mysore, but in 1805-6 saw further service in north India with General Lake.

In early 1808 the Governor-General, Lord Minto, sent him on a second mission to Iran, but at this time French influence was dominant in Tehran, and he was rebuffed. Later that year a separate mission from London under Sir Harford Jones arrived in Iran and achieved success, the Iran government having by then become disenchanted with the French. Malcolm was again sent to Iran in 1810, but by that time the British government had decided to conduct diplomatic relations with Iran directly from London, and appointed Sir Gore Ouseley as ambassador.

In 1812 Malcolm returned to Britain for five years' furlough, and spent much of his time as a writer, completing his History of Iran (the first in English derived directly from Iran sources) in 1815. For this he received an honorary DCL from the University of Oxford. Returning to India in 1817, he acted as the Governor-General's agent in negotiations leading up to the third (and last) Anglo-Maratha war. He also acted as a general, leading Company troops to victory against Maharajah Malhar Rao Holkar II at the decisive Battle of Mahidpur (Mehidpoor) on 21 December 1817. In January 1818, Malcolm was placed by the Marquis of Hastings in the military and political charge of Central India (roughly, today's Madhya Pradesh); during the four years he filled that station, his attention was directed to the object of collecting materials for the illustration of its past and present condition. The report hereof he sent to Calcutte, where it was printed by order of Government. Disappointed to being superseded for the governorship of Bombay and Madras by his juniors, Malcolm left for Britain in 1822, where he lived with his family as a country gentleman, completing two more books.

In 1827 he was appointed Governor of Bombay. His governorship was generally successful, despite controversy over an unfortunate quarrel with the judges of the Bombay Supreme Court, who sought to extend their jurisdiction beyond Bombay to the Deccan hinterland, newly acquired by the company from the Maratha Peshwa of Poona. In seeking to end both sati (the self-immolation of widows on their husband's funeral pyres) and female infanticide by moral persuasion, Malcolm visited Gujarat in February 1830 and met Sahajanand Swami, the founder of the Swaminarayan sect of Hinduism, who was advocating similar reforms. He has ever since been remembered in Swaminarayan literature. Together with his predecessor, Mountstuart Elphinstone, he was a pioneer in the promotion of Indian education and the training of Indians for the higher ranks of government. He also served as president of the Literary Society of Bombay

In 1831 Malcolm finally returned to Britain, and immediately became a Member of Parliament for the rotten borough of Launceston, supporting his friend the Duke of Wellington in opposition to the Reform Bill. He bought Warfield Hall in Berkshire from the Parry family and busied himself renovating it. His last public act was a speech in April 1833 to the Proprietors (shareholders) of the East India Company, persuading them to accept the Government's terms for renewal of its Charter. Immediately afterwards he suffered a stroke and died on 30 May 1833. He was buried in St James's Church, Piccadilly.

There is a marble statue of Malcolm, by Francis Chantrey, in the north transept of Westminster Abbey. There is also a statue of him in the town hall at Bombay and a 100-foot-high obelisk celebrating his achievements on Whita Hill, above Langholm in Scotland.

Family
In 1807 he married (in Mysore) Isabella Charlotte, the second daughter of General Sir Alexander Campbell. She bore five children, including George Alexander Malcolm.

Legacy
Together with his contemporaries Mountstuart Elphinstone and Sir Thomas Munro, Malcolm was an architect of three early principles of British rule, whose wisdom "was too soon forgotten and remembered too late".
Four main themes can be identified. Firstly, India was to be ruled for the benefit of the company – but also of Indians, i.e. no British settlers. 
Secondly, indirect rule was to be preferred, leaving existing Indian rulers in place wherever possible, with minimal disturbance of traditional methods of governance, religion and social structure.
Thirdly, Malcolm helped to develop the role of the District Officer, a small group of powerful administrators with minimal overt force to support them.
Fourthly, Malcolm promoted a 'forward' foreign policy; meaning diplomatic engagement with neighbouring states such as Iran, Afghanistan and Central Asia.

He was a mentor and inspiration to several celebrated Anglo-Indian statesmen – among them Henry Pottinger, Charles Metcalfe, Alexander Burnes and Henry Rawlinson

Literary works

Malcolm wrote nine books, plus a volume of poetry, as follows:

Sketch of the Sikhs, 1812

Sketch of the Political History of India, 1811

Disturbances in the Madras Army in 1809, 1812

The History of Persia, 1815

A Memoir of Central India, 1823

The Political History of India, 1826

Sketches of Persia; this book is not written by Malcolm,but by one of his companions in his mission to Iran; the writer remains anonymous and has introduced himself as the traveller;he has referred  to Malcolm in his text as ilchi ,which is a Persian word means envoy of a foreign country .   , 1827

The Government of India, 1833

The Life of Robert, Lord Clive, 1836 (posthumous)

References

Further reading
 
 
 
 
 
 
 Significant Scots

External links

 

1769 births
1833 deaths
19th-century Scottish historians
Scottish politicians
Governors of Bombay
People from Dumfries and Galloway
British East India Company Army generals
UK MPs 1830–1831
UK MPs 1831–1832
Members of the Parliament of the United Kingdom for Launceston
Fellows of the Royal Society
British military personnel of the Third Anglo-Mysore War
British military personnel of the Fourth Anglo-Mysore War
British military personnel of the Third Anglo-Maratha War
Knights Grand Cross of the Order of the Bath
Burials at St James's Church, Piccadilly
People of the Russo-Persian Wars